Joymoti Konwari, was the wife of Tai-Ahom Prince Gadapani (later Supatphaa).  She was accorded the honorific Mohiyokhi on account of her heroic endurance of torture until the end, dying at the hands of royalists under Sulikphaa Loraa Roja without disclosing her exiled husband Prince Gadapani's whereabouts, thereby enabling her husband to rise in revolt and assume kingship. Gadapani and Joymoti's son Rudra Singha had the Joysagar Tank dug at the spot where she was tortured.  The first Assamese film Joymoti, directed in 1935 by Jyoti Prasad Agarwala, was based on her life.

Biography
Joymoti was born in the middle of the 17th-century in Maduri to Laithepena Borgohain and Chandradaru.  She was married to Langi Gadapani Konwar, later an Ahom king, Supatphaa, who established the Tungkhunia line of kings.  During the Purge of the Princes from 1679 to 1681 under King Sulikphaa (Loraa Roja), instigated by Laluksola Borphukan, Gadapani took flight.  Over the next few years, he sought shelter in the Naga hills.

Failing to trace Prince Gadapani, Sulikphaa's soldiers brought his wife Joymoti to Jerenga Pathar where, despite torture, the princess refused to reveal the whereabouts of her husband. After continuous physical torture over 14 days, Joymoti died on 13 Sot of 1601 Saka, or 27 March 1680.

Memorials and monuments

Joysagar Tank
Joymoti and Gadadhar Singha's eldest son Rudra Singha (Sukhrungphaa, 1696–1714) succeeded his father. In honour of the memory of his mother Joymoti, Rudra Singha built the Joysagar Tank in 1697 at Sibsagar. A 2 km-long earthen water pipeline once ran from the tank to the Rangpur Palace (Kareng Ghar), supplying water to the royal palace.

Fakuwa Dol
Rudra Singha also built the Fakuwa Dol in 1703–04, a pyramid-shaped temple constructed before the Rangnath (Shiva) Temple on the banks of the Joysagar Tank. It is said that Rudra Singha, once again to perpetuate the memory of his mother Soti Joymoti, constructed the temple and placed a golden idol of her within it. There were eight brick pillars around the temple.

Joymoti Day 
Sati Joymoti Divas, commemoration day of Joymoti, is held annually in Assam on 27 March.

Sati Joymoti Award
The State Government of Assam has instituted an annual award in the name of Joymoti, presented to women in recognition of excellence in their chosen fields of work.

Film and theatre
 

Joymoti (1935 film) was the first Assamese language film, directed and produced by Jyoti Prasad Agarwala. In 2006, Manju Borah released another film by the same name. The 19th-century Assamese writer Lakshminath Bezbaruah depicted her life in the drama Joymoti Kuwori.

See also
 Ahom Dynasty

Notes

References

External links
 Joymoti Konwari: an epitome of ideal womanhood – Dr Kathita Hatibaruah

Indian female royalty
People of the Ahom kingdom
People from Sivasagar
Indian torture victims
17th-century Indian monarchs
17th-century Indian women
17th-century Indian people
1680 deaths
Year of birth unknown
Ahom kingdom